The women's shot put event  at the 1999 IAAF World Indoor Championships was held on March 6.

Results

* Vita Pavlysh and Irina Korzhanenko originally won gold and silver respectively but were later disqualified for doping.

References
Results

Shot
Shot put at the World Athletics Indoor Championships
1999 in women's athletics